Raima Sen (born Raima Dev Varma on 7 November 1979) is an Indian actress who is known for her work in the Hindi and Bengali films.

Early life
Raima Sen was born on 7 November 1979 in Bombay (now Mumbai) to Moon Moon Sen and Bharat Dev Varma and the granddaughter of actress Suchitra Sen who is regarded as the Mahanayika of Bengali Cinema. Her sister Riya Sen is also in the Bollywood industry. Their father Bharat Dev Varma is a member of the royal family of Tripura. Her paternal grandmother, Ila Devi, was the princess of Cooch Behar, whose younger sister Gayatri Devi was the Maharani of Jaipur. Her paternal great-grandmother Indira was the only daughter of Maharaja Sayajirao Gaekwad III of Baroda.

Raima's maternal great-grandfather Adinath Sen was a prominent Kolkata businessman, whose son Dinanath Sen – a relative of former Union Law Minister Ashoke Kumar Sen- was the Diwan or a Minister of the Maharaja of Tripura. The sisters are credited on-screen under their mother's maiden name, although their official papers carry the surname Dev Varma.

Personal life 
Sen is said to resemble her grandmother much more than either her mother or her sister. In an interview, she says while she enjoys Mumbai's faster pace of life, its gyms and its nightclubs, she misses her family in Kolkata, her dog Cuddles, and Kolkata's street food, notably Jhal Muri and Aloo chaat. Raima Sen in 2006 admitted that she had a brief relation with Odisha politician Kalikesh Narayan Singh Deo in 2006–2007, but the relationship did not last long.

Career

Sen made her debut in the film Godmother, which was a critically acclaimed success, but her minor role may have been overlooked in favour of the protagonist, played by Shabana Azmi. She then starred in the film Daman playing Raveena Tandon's daughter, where her small performance was appreciated.

Her breakthrough role came when she starred in the Rituparno Ghosh's film Chokher Bali. After a few more average movies she had a critically acclaimed hit in 2005 with Parineeta, where she played the playmate of the film's heroine, played by the debutante Vidya Balan. Since then she has had two more hits with the action thriller Dus and the Bengali film Antar Mahal (where she had a very small role). In 2006, she appeared in the film The Bong Connection (co-starring Shayan Munshi). In 2007, she worked in the thriller Manorama Six Feet Under with Abhay Deol. In 2011, she starred in the hit Bengali film Baishe Srabon, opposite Parambrata Chatterjee.

2014 saw Sen as the leading lady in the critically acclaimed Hrid Majharey, the first Bengali movie based on the works of William Shakespeare, and presented as a tribute on the 450th year of birth of the Bard. She co-stars with Abir Chatterjee and Indrasish Roy in this dark love-story by debutant filmmaker Ranjan Ghosh. The film has earned a rare recommendation from the Film London in its list of world cinema based on the plays of Shakespeare. The film and its screenplay have also been included in the UGC Literature Archive. It is also famous for being the only other Bengali film after Sabuj Dweeper Raja (1979) to be shot in the Andaman and Nicobar Islands.

In 2016, she was seen in Bollywood Diaries, a film written and directed by K.D. Satyam. The film also stars Ashish Vidyarthi and Salim Diwan. Amazon Prime The Last Hour Web Series will release in 2020 Ending in this series Raima Sen & Sanjay Kapoor playing the main role this series directed by Amit Kumar.

Filmography

Web series

Awards and nominations 

 2006: BFJA-Most Promising Actress Award for Nishi Japan

References

External links 

1979 births
Living people
Actresses from Kolkata
Actresses from Mumbai
Indian film actresses
Indian web series actresses
Actresses in Bengali cinema
Actresses in Hindi cinema
Actresses in Telugu cinema
Actresses in Malayalam cinema
Actresses from Tripura
Tripuri people
Bengali actresses
Bengal Film Journalists' Association Award winners
University of Calcutta alumni
21st-century Indian actresses
Tripuri actors